Music for the Movies: Bernard Herrmann is a 1992 documentary film directed by Joshua Waletzky. It was nominated for an Academy Award for Best Documentary Feature.

Cast
 Elmer Bernstein - Himself
 Claudine Bouché - Herself
 Royal S. Brown - Himself
 Claude Chabrol - Himself
 Norman Corwin - Himself
 Don Cristlieb - Himself
 Lucille Fletcher - Herself
 Bernard Herrmann - Himself
 Paul Hirsch - Himself
 Louis Kaufman - Himself
 Virginia Majewski - Herself
 Christopher Palmer - Himself
 David Raksin - Himself
 Alan Robinson - Himself
 Martin Scorsese - Himself
 James G. Stewart - Himself

References

External links

Music for the Movies: Bernard Herrmann at Kultur International Films

1992 films
1990s French-language films
American documentary films
French documentary films
Documentary films about the film industry
Documentary films about music and musicians
1992 documentary films
1990s English-language films
1990s American films
1990s French films